The Alpini Paratroopers Battalion "Monte Cervino" is the sole battalion of the Italian Army's 4th Alpini Paratroopers Regiment, which is one of the Italy's special forces units. The regiment is based in Verona in Veneto and assigned to the Army Special Forces Command. The Alpini are a mountain infantry corps of the Italian Army that distinguished itself in combat during World War I and World War II. To this day, this is the only unit of "mountain paratroopers" in the world.

World War I 
In November 1915, the Alpini Battalion "Monte Cervino" was raised in the village of Ivrea in northern Italy as reserve unit of the 4th Alpini Regiment. Initially only fielding the 133rd Alpini Company, it was augmented by the 87th and 103rd Alpini Companies, which were reserve companies of the Alpini Battalion "Aosta" of the same regiment. After a short training period in the village of Tirano, the battalion was sent in April 1916 to the Asiago plateau to reinforce the front during the Austrian Strafexpedition offensive. On May 15, 1916 the 103rd Company had to surrender at the Borcola Pass after a fierce fight with the Austrians, while the 87th and 133rd companies were able to retreat. With the start of the Italian counter-offensive the battalion fought in the Caldiera e Posina valleys.

In 1917, the battalion was employed on the Isonzo Front in a futile attempt to take Monte Vodice. In November of the same year, the battalion was tasked to defend the Melette di Gallio on the Asiago plateau against a renewed Austrian attacks. Afterwards, it was sent to the rear to rest and refit. In June 1918, the battalion defended the Monte Fior and Monte Castelgomberto mountains against the last Austrian attempt to break through the Italian lines on the Asiago plateau and thus open up a way into the Padan plain. Thirty officers and 1,000 Alpinis of the battalion died during the defence of Monte Fior - 2/3 of the unit's men at the onset of the Austrian offensive. For this sacrifice, the battalion was awarded Italy's second highest military order: the Silver Medal of Military Valor.

After being augmented with new recruits, the battalion spent the last months of the war on Monte Pasubio and later Monte Grappa. With the cessation of hostilities, the battalion was dissolved in 1919.

World War II 
The battalion was reformed in 1940 as the Skiers Battalion "Monte Cervino", with the 1st and 2nd skiers companies, and was sent as reinforcement to the crumbling Italian front on the Albanian border with Greece. After the German invasion of Greece and subsequent cessation of hostilities, the battalion was dissolved in May 1941. For the successful operations in the Greek theatre, the battalion was awarded Italy's highest military order: the Gold Medal of Military Valor.

Five months later, the battalion was again reformed with two ski companies and the 80th Support Weapons Company. The battalion was then sent to the Soviet Union as part of the Italian Army in Russia. There, the battalion distinguished itself in heavy combat with Soviet forces in the Italian campaign on the Eastern Front, barely escaping annihilation in the Battle of Nikolayevka. After its return to Italy in spring of 1943, the battalion was awarded its second Gold Medal of Military Valor. The battalion was then assigned to the XX Alpini Skiers Group, but did not participate in combat. The battalion surrendered to German forces in France in September 1943 after the Armistice between Italy and Allied armed forces.

The Cold War 
During the Cold War, the IV Alpine Army Corps in Bolzano raised Alpini Paratroopers platoons in all five of its brigades. The first to become active was the platoon of the Alpine Brigade "Tridentina", which officially was added to the brigade's unit roll on 1 September 1952. That platoon was quickly followed by platoons raised in the Alpine Brigade "Julia", Alpine Brigade "Taurinense", Alpine Brigade "Cadore" and Alpine Brigade "Orobica". On 1 April 1964, the five platoons were merged into an Alpini Paratroopers Company (COMPALPAR), under the direct command of the IV Alpine Army Corps. On 1 January 1990, the company received the name "Monte Cervino" and became the heir to the battalion's colours and traditions. In 1993, the company was sent to Mozambique as part of the Italian contribution to the United Nations Operation in Mozambique.

On 14 July 1996, the Alpini Paratroopers Company "Monte Cervino" became the first company of the reformed Alpini Paratroopers Battalion "Monte Cervino", which quickly augmented its personnel by adding a second Alpini Paratroopers Company. From 1997 onwards, the battalion was employed in Bosnia as part of SFOR. Beginning in 2002, the battalion was constantly present with at least a company of troops in Afghanistan as part of the International Security Assistance Force.

Today 
On 25 September 2004, the Monte Cervino became the sole battalion of the reformed 4th Alpini Paratroopers Regiment. Today, the 4th Alpini Paratroopers Regiment is one of the Italian Army's Special Forces units. Its structure is as follows:

  4th Alpini Paratroopers Regiment
  Regimental Staff and Personnel Office
  Operations, Training, and Information Office
  Logistic Office
  IT Protocol Office
  Administrative Service
  Command and Logistic Support Company "Aquile"
  Alpini Battalion "Monte Cervino"
  1st Ranger Company
  2nd Ranger Company
  80th Ranger Company
  Training Company

As one of the best trained and equipped units of the Italian Army the Alpini Paratroopers have recently served in Iraq and one company is constantly deployed to Afghanistan.

References

External links 
 Official Homepage
 Site dedicated to Alpini units: "Monte Cervino" battalion

Alpini
Ranger units and formations
Army units and formations of Italy in World War II
Special forces of Italy
Greco-Italian War